Rod Carrillo is a Panamaian electronic dance music record producer and the CEO of Carrillo Music. Originally hailing from the Republic of Panama, Carillo specializes in dance music with a Latin influence.

He founded Carrillo Music in 2007 and has consistently worked as a remixer, DJ, and producer.

Career
Rod Carrillo discovered his passion for music when working as a DJ at just 15 years of age. After he got the ball rolling in his DJ career, everything snowballed. He regularly worked the nightclub circuit and played various sets on local radio stations. He also performed at corporate events while attending law school.

He also regularly collaborates with a diverse array of artists. He has worked with Ralphi Rosario, Eddie Amador, Danny Howard, Futuristic Polar Bears, Terri B!, Rosabel and Eric Redd, Warp Brothers, D.O.N.S., Kissy Sell Out among many others.

In 2019, he worked with Ralphi Rosario and Abel Aguilera executive producing and spearheading the duo's first studio album under their alias Rosabel. Rosabel's studio project was named The Album. Rosabel's 14 song album featured singers Jeanie Tracy, Terri Bjerre and Tamara Wallace. The Album was released in April 2019 to positive reviews. Upon its release, The Album ranked in the top 10 Billboard Dance/Electronic Sales in United States. Shortly after, Rosabel announced shortly after a tour in support for their new music.

In May 2019, artist Eric Redd released his single "Push", which was produced by Carrillo. The collaboration with Eric Redd garnished overwhelming success from the House Music community. "Push" earned positions in the Top 20 Soulful House Sales Chart, Top 100 Overall Sales Chart on the music download site Traxsource.com. "Push" was chosen as Weekend Weapon Pick and as a pick for Traxsource.com's Essential House Playlist.

Carrillo released his second studio album, Los Sonidos, in 2019. The 10 song album includes collaborations with Terri Bjerre, Hoxton Whores, Ralphi Rosario, Lisa Williams, Kid.a, Claras "Beefy" Brown, Eric Redd and Reiss Harrison.

Los Sonidos was produced and composed while Carrillo was in between projects in England, Panama, Canada and Spain in 2018/early 2019.

The project was kept the project under wraps up to the time of release by Carrillo and his collaborators.

Upon its release, Los Sonidos received very favorable reviews from Electronic Music publications and blogs.

The first single from Los Sonidos was "You Got What I Need" which is a collaboration between Carrillo and vocalist Terri Bjerre. "You Got What I Need" charted in the top 25 dance club chart for Billboard Magazine.

Discography

Producer/artist 
2019 - "Last Night In Miami" - Kat Deluna - (Remix Production: arranger, composer, remixer)
2019 - "You Got What I Need" - Rod Carrillo, Terri Bjerre - (Arranger, Composer, Executive Producer)
2019 - "The Album" - Rosabel - (Engineer, Executive Producer)
2019 - "Cello House" - Soleil Carrillo - (Arranger, Composer, Executive Producer)
2019 - "Take It Off" - Reiss Harrison - (Composer, arranger, Executive Producer)
2019 - "Push" - Eric Redd - (Composer, Arranger, Writer, Executive Producer)
2019 - "Night To Remember" - The Terri Green Project (Remixer, A&R)
2017 - "Anthem of House" - Rosabel & Terri Bjerre (Executive producer, remixer, engineer) 
2017 - "Alegre" - Rod Carrillo - (Composer, Writer)
2017 - "Right Time" - Eric Redd - (Composer, Writer, Executive Producer)
2016 - "Bajada" - Rod Carrillo - (Composer, Arranger, Executive Producer)
2016 - "2 Sides To The Story" - Ralphi Rosario (Executive producer, Vocals Engineer, Production, A&R)
2016 - "Night Shift" - Sol N Beef (Composer, Arranger, Executive Producer)
2015 - "La Jungla" - Ralphi Rosario ft. Julissa Veloz (Vocals Engineer, Executive Producer)
2015 - "Sax Please" - Sol N Beef (Composer, Arranger, Executive Producer)
2015 - "Tickle My" - The Head Assembly ft. Julissa Veloz (Composer, arranger, Executive Producer)
2013 - "Come With Me" (album) - Kelsey B. (Executive Producer, composer, arranger)
2013 - "Stronger" (album) - Bouvier & Barona (Executive Producer)
2013 - "What Cha Feelin'" - Liam Keegan feat. Julissa Veloz & Kae Lou
2013 - "Hurts" - Kelsey B (Carvelo production with Julissa Veloz)
2013 - "Need You' - Kelsey B. 
2013 - "I'm Dancin'" - Eric Redd
2013 - "Surrender" - Bouvier & Barona feat. Abigail (singer)
2013 - "See Dis" - Kelsey B 
2012 - "Different" - Trevor Simpson and Julissa Veloz
2012 - "Don't Care - Eric Redd
2012 - "2 of Us" - Jesse McFadding feat. Julissa Veloz
2012 - "Be With You" - Kelsey B
2012 - "Zimme (Give It All)" - Julissa Veloz
2012 - "Overload" - Julissa Veloz
2012 - "It Would" - Julissa Veloz
2012 - "Very Brady Day" Julissa Veloz
2012 - "Status" - Carvelo feat. Kelsey B
2012 - The Noise EP - Matt Fox
2011 - "Yes No Maybe" - RCDM feat. Candace Sames
2011 - "Boy If You Only Knew" - Kelsey B
2011 - "54" - Eric Redd
2011 - "Another Day" - Eric Redd
2011 - Mayhem - Julissa Veloz
2011 - "Rave Juice" - Matt Fox feat. LsDub
2011 - "Pressure" - Matt Fox feat. LsDub
2011 - "Downtown" - Matt Fox feat. Kelsey B
2011 - "Eat It" - Matt Fox feat. Ny-D
2011 - "Brat Attack" - Matt Fox
2011 - "Fiction" - Matt Fox
2011 - "Dumb" - Natalia Flores
2011 - "Azucarena" (Album) - Natalia Flores (Executive Producer, composer, arranger)
2011 - "Faceless" - Rod Carrillo & Shefali
2011 - "Sweet Sugar Poison" - Dave Matthias vs Julissa Veloz
2011 - "Candela" - Bodega Charlie
2011 - "Beauty Queen" - Kelsey B
2010 - "Take Control" - Julissa Veloz (US Dance #8)
2010 - "Going Strong" - Natalia Flores (US Dance #18)
2010 - "Predator" - Julissa Veloz (US Dance #19)
2010 - "Breathe" - Eric Redd (US Dance #32)
2010 - "Prelude" - Rod Carrillo and Ronnie Sumrall,
2010 - "Eyes on Me" - Rod Carrillo and Ronnie Sumrall,
2010 - "Breakin' Out" - Rod Carrillo and Ronnie Sumrall,
2010 - "Achilles Heel" - Rod Carrillo and Ronnie Sumrall,
2010 - "Doin' Better" - Rod Carrillo and Ronnie Sumrall,
2010 - "It's Not Like You" - Rod Carrillo and Ronnie Sumrall,
2010 - "Let It Go" - Rod Carrillo and Ronnie Sumrall,
2010 - "Oh Yeah" - Rod Carrillo and Ronnie Sumrall,
2010 - "Long Time" - Rod Carrillo and Ronnie Sumrall (US Dance #23)
2010 - "Rhythm" - Rod Carrillo and Ronnie Sumrall,
2009 - "Angel On The Dancefloor" - Dave Matthias feat. Natalia Flores (US Dance #23)
2009 - "Moonshine Rising" - Rod Carrillo and Ronnie Sumrall (US Dance #25),
2009 - "Here We Come' - Rod Carrillo and Shefali (US Dance #25),
2009 - "Big Mama's House" - Capretta (Big Mama Capretta)
2009 - "Gringa Quiero Baila" - Rod Carrillo Presents: Bodega Charlie feat. Fulanito
2008 - "Dale Mami" - Mula
2008 - "Save Me" - Carrillo & Amador feat. Ronnie Sumrall
2008 - "Oye Party" - Rod Carrillo Presents: Bodega Charlie (US Dance #13)
2007 - "Arizona Bump" - Rod Carrillo (US Dance #23)
2007 - "Green Tea" - Big J
2007 - "Nonsense Words" - Attorney Client Privilege feat DBL
2007 - " I Wish You Well" - Carrillo & Amador feat. Nina Lares
2007 - "Spotlight" - Carrillo & Amador feat. Georgia Nicole (US Dance #8)
2007 - "Work It" - DJ Kilo
2007 - "Free Your Mind" - Kario

Los Sonidos track list

References

External links
Carrillo Music
Carrillo Music Youtube
Rod Carrillo Website

Remixers
Panamanian record producers
Living people
Year of birth missing (living people)